Mallocampa is a genus of moths in the family Lasiocampidae. The genus was erected by Per Olof Christopher Aurivillius in 1902.

Species
Mallocampa alenica Strand, 1912
Mallocampa audea Druce, 1887
Mallocampa cornutiventris Tams, 1929
Mallocampa dollmani Tams, 1925
Mallocampa jaensis Bethune-Baker, 1927
Mallocampa leighi Aurivillius, 1922
Mallocampa leucophaea Holland, 1893
Mallocampa porphyria Holland, 1893
Mallocampa punctilimbata Strand, 1912
Mallocampa schultzei Aurivillius
Mallocampa toulgoeti Rougeot, 1977
Mallocampa zopheropa Bethune-Baker, 1911

References

Lasiocampidae